Moghrar is a district in Naâma Province, Algeria. It was named after its capital, Moghrar.

Municipalities
The district is further divided into 2 municipalities:
Moghrar
Djeniane Bourzeg

 
Districts of Naâma Province